Umngqusho is a South African dish based on samp and sugar beans, usually served with hard body chicken which is called umleqwa in isiXhosa. This dish is a staple meal for most South African families, referred to as isitambu by the Zulu people and umngqusho by the Xhosa people.

How to pronounce umngqusho 
Umngqusho is pronounced as “oom-nqoo-shoh”, for this word, you have to press your tongue on the roof of your mouth, just behind your teeth, to get the sound, the ‘q’ does not sound like a ‘k’ as it does in English.

Preparation 
Soak the samp and sugar beans overnight in cold water. Drain and place in a heavy-based saucepan with 1 litre of water. Boil until soft and season with salt and pepper.

Ingredients 
Some of South Africa’s chefs usually add onion, garlic and spices to enhance the taste. The Xhosa version, served with butter or fat, was apparently Nelson Mandela's favourite dish.

See also

 List of African dishes
 List of legume dishes

References

South African cuisine
Legume dishes
Xhosa people
Nguni